William "Bill" Kincaid (born 1957, in Chicago) was known nationally in the entertainment trade as a costume designer until 1990, and is also known as an artist creating pet paintings in brilliant colors on large canvases.

Education
Kincaid attended art class at the Washington University in St. Louis during the early 1980s, although not as an art major.

Employment 
After graduating from Washington University, he painted miscellaneous portraits of people, occasional copies of classic paintings, and abstracts in his spare time. He focused on pets after he painted a friend's Boston Terrier.
Kincaid's first employment in an art field was in 1974, working as a custom motorcycle artist at "Buzz's Psycles" of Chamblee, Georgia. He painted restorations of classic British bikes such as the Bonnevilles and Trophies built in the middle and late 1960s by Triumph Motorcycles and did customization work. He left Georgia in 1977.

Influences
He has listed as major influences 1960s psychedelia, surrealism and Pop Art; Andy Warhol, Peter Max, Salvador Dalí, and other less-known genre artists. Although the medium, acrylics on canvas, has been consistent throughout his painting career, his painting style has varied throughout a limited body of work.

Activities
From 1977 through 1989, he made thousands of costumes, also drawing and painting costume designs and various commercial graphics projects, in partnership with his brother Doug Kincaid.  Bill Kincaid often participated in every step from the initial drawings, patterns and materials selection through the final cutting and assembly. 

During his active years with The Kincaid Karacter Company, he was instrumental in the design, development, and creation of many iconic mascot characters for some of the world's best known organizations, including "BUDMAN" & "Spuds MCKENZIE" for Anheuser-Busch (AB-InBev), "FredBird" for The St. Louis Cardinals, "Little Caesar" for Little Caesar's Pizza, and "Elroy Elk", the National Drug Awareness Program mascot for The Benevolent and Protective Order of Elks (ELKS Association). He also designed & created hundreds of other popular mascots for Ralston Purina, Six Flags, Blue Cross/Blue Shield, M-TV, Hostess Cakes, and The United States Postal Service, as well as designing & creating the character of "Grouchie Gator" (star of the CBS children's show "Gator Tales"),  plus many other memorable "Kincaid Karacter" puppets. 

His non-costume & puppet related projects included props for numerous TV commercials, promotions, and industrial films, as well as board games, coloring books, and logos. From 1981 to 1999, Kincaid also created puppets, scenery and props for CBS children's television shows D. B.'s Delight and Gator Tales, plus rendered & constructed remodels of sets for Six Flags attractions.

William specializes in painting dogs, cats and other pets in his distinctive style. William is semi-retired and paints occasionally, always on commission, and chooses his commissions selectively. He has supported animal protection groups as well as organizations which advocate equal rights, freedoms and protections for LGBTQIA+ people, the poor, the sick, the elderly, and refugees. He lives in the Midwest.

Kincaid also writes essays on cultural and historical topics, such as "Really Remembering the Alamo". He has also self-published a successful book of short fiction under a pseudonym.

References
 St. Louis Post Dispatch, January 7, 1983, "Almost Live! Dodo is rare bird indeed" – biographical article on William Kincaid
 St. Louis Globe-Democrat, July 5, 1999, "Talented brothers are creators..." – article on Bill and Doug Kincaid
 St. Louis Business Journal, September 12, 1988, "Those Guys at Kincaid are really Characters" – biographical article on William Kincaid and The Kincaid Karacter Company
 St. Louis Post Dispatch, March 20, 1989, "Kids Learning Responsibility With 'Gator' Aid" – article on Bill Kincaid and Gator Tales television show
 Inc._(magazine), September 10, 2018, "Meet the Company Behind Thousands of America's Favorite Mascots"- article on William Kincaid, Doug Kincaid, and The Kincaid Karacter Company

External links
 The Pet Portraits of William Kincaid

Inc. Magazine article on Bill and Doug Kincaid

1957 births
Living people
Painters from Kentucky
20th-century American painters
American male painters
21st-century American painters
21st-century male artists
Washington University in St. Louis alumni